My Name Is Harry Worth is a British comedy television series which originally aired on ITV in a series of eight episodes in 1974. It starred Harry Worth and Lally Bowers as his landlady Mrs Maybury. Worth plays a mild-mannered, well meaning man who ends up in a series of unlikely adventures. Three of the episodes were scripted by the writing team of George Layton and Jonathan Lynn. The series was made at Teddington Studios, and the opening credits were shot outside the nearby Strawberry Hill railway station.

Actors who appeared in episodes of the series included Gerald Sim, Sally Geeson, Reginald Marsh, David Lodge, Glyn Houston, Derek Francis, Peter Jones, Harry Littlewood, John Lyons, Derek Newark, Norman Mitchell and Robert Raglan.

Cast

 Harry Worth - Harry
 Lally Bowers - Mrs Maybury 
 James Appleby - Patrolman
 Reginald Marsh - George Bailey  
 Irene Peters - Girl 
 Tim Barrett - Mr Regan
 John Bindon - Constable 
 Anthony Chinn - Chinese Waiter
 John Clegg - Shop Assistant 
 Derek Francis - Arnold Hobbs
 Glyn Houston - PC Jackson 
 Peter Jones - Mr Bunting
 Harry Littlewood - TV Reporter
 David Lodge - Inspector Brown

References

Bibliography
 Walker, Craig. On The Buses: The Complete Story. Andrews UK Limited, 2011.

External links
 

1974 British television series debuts
1974 British television series endings
1970s British comedy television series
ITV sitcoms
English-language television shows
Television shows produced by Thames Television
Television shows set in London
Television shows shot at Teddington Studios